The Frog Lake First Nation is a First Nations band government in northern Alberta. A signatory to Treaty 6, it controls two Indian reserves, Puskiakiwenin 122 and Unipouheos 121, as well as sharing ownership of another, Blue Quills.

FLFNs is governed by an elected Chief and Council who oversee a variety of community services, including: Employment and Training, Daycare, Education, Economic Development, Finance, Health, Housing, Human Services, Post-secondary, Public works, and Youth. The nation is also home to several economic ventures, including: Frog Lake Energy Resources Corporation which explores for and develops oil and gas resources, Tribal Chiefs Ventures Inc. which offers employment training, and the Tribal Chiefs Development Inc. business consortium.

References

First Nations governments in Alberta
Cree governments